MRS-1706 is a selective inverse agonist for the adenosine A2B receptor. It inhibits release of interleukins and has an antiinflammatory effect.

References 

Xanthines
Phenol ethers
Acetanilides
Aromatic ketones
Adenosine receptor antagonists